Diocese of Syunik ( Syunyats t'em) is one of the largest dioceses of the Armenian Apostolic Church covering the Syunik Province of Armenia. It is named after the historic province of Syunik; the 9th province of the Kingdom of Armenia. The diocesan headquarters are located in the town of Goris. The seat of the bishop is the Saint Gregory Cathedral.

The diocese was established on 30 May 1996. Since its creation until December 2010, bishop Abraham Mkrtchyan has served as its primate. Rev. Fr. Zaven Yazichyan succeed him as primate of the diocese.

Gallery

References

Syunik
Christianity in Armenia
History of the Republic of Artsakh
Syunik Province
Oriental Orthodox dioceses in Armenia